Mathurapati Phulbari is a village development committee in Kabhrepalanchok District in the Bagmati Zone of central Nepal. At the time of the 1991 Nepal census it had a population of 4,565. The village is situated 45 km east from capital city Kathmandu. It is situated in the upper belt of the B.P Highway which joins Capital to Eastern Terai in the shortest route. The village has a mixed community including several ethnic groups staying in harmony. The main castes living in Phulbari are Brahmins, Chhetris, Tamangs, Newars  and other castes. Nowadays Fulbari VDC is included in Dapcha Kashikanda municipality. Fulbari VDC main industry area is Bhakundebesi.

References

External links
UN map of the municipalities of Kavrepalanchowk District

Populated places in Kavrepalanchok District